The 2012 UTEP Miners football team represented the University of Texas at El Paso in the 2012 NCAA Division I FBS football season. They were led by ninth year head coach Mike Price and played their home games at Sun Bowl Stadium. They were a member of the West Division of Conference USA. They finished the season 3–9, 2–6 in C-USA play to finish in a tie for fifth place in the West Division. Head coach Mike Price retired at the end of the season. UTEP averaged 29,374 fans per game.

Schedule

Game summaries

Oklahoma

@ Ole Miss

New Mexico State

@ Wisconsin

@ East Carolina

SMU

@ Tulsa

Tulane

@ Houston

UCF

@ Southern Miss

Rice

References

UTEP
UTEP Miners football seasons
UTEP Miners football